Hiskatherium is an extinct genus of small ground sloth from the Middle Miocene (Friasian to Mayoan) Honda Group of Bolivia. The type species H. saintandrei was named in 2011 on the basis of a lower jaw. Although it has not been placed in a specific family, Hiskatherium is similar to the extinct sloths Hapalops and Xyophorus.

References 

Prehistoric sloths
Miocene xenarthrans
Miocene mammals of South America
Mayoan
Laventan
Colloncuran
Friasian
Neogene Bolivia
Fossils of Bolivia
Fossil taxa described in 2011